An Operational Requirement, commonly abbreviated OR, was a United Kingdom (UK) Air Ministry document setting out the required characteristics for a future (i.e., as-yet unbuilt) military aircraft or weapon system.

The numbered OR would describe what intended role the aircraft would be used for, e.g., bomber, fighter, etc., or what type of weapon was required, e.g., gun, armament, bomb type, etc.

In conjunction with any official specification, prospective manufacturers would then choose whether to design an aircraft or weapon for this particular requirement.

Operational Requirements were carried over with the dissolution of the Air Ministry and the creation of the Ministry of Defence (MoD).

Other requirements
An Experimental Requirement (ER) was for an aircraft for research purposes; e.g., ER.100 in support of development of the English Electric Lightning.

See also
List of Operational Requirements for nuclear weapons
List of Air Ministry specifications

Notes

Further reading

Cold War military equipment of the United Kingdom
United Kingdom defence procurement
British military aircraft